Oskar Paul Dirlewanger (26 September 1895 – ) was a German military officer (SS-Oberführer) who served as the founder and commander of the Nazi SS penal unit "Dirlewanger" during World War II. Serving in Poland and in Belarus, his name is closely linked to some of the most notorious crimes of the war. He also fought in World War I, the post-World War I conflicts, and the Spanish Civil War. He reportedly died after World War II while in Allied custody. According to historian Timothy Snyder, "in all the theaters of the Second World War, few could compete in cruelty with Dirlewanger".

Early life
Dirlewanger was born in Würzburg on 26 September 1895. He was the son of a merchant, and spent much of his childhood in Esslingen Am Neckar after his family moved there in 1906. He attended the Esslinger Gymnasium (known today as the Georgii-Gymnasium) and the Schelztor-Oberrealschule. He completed his Abitur in 1913.

World War I
Dirlewanger enlisted in the Württemberg Army on the 1 October 1913, and served as a machine gunner in the "König Karl" Grenadier Regiment 123, a part of the XIII (Royal Württemberg) Corps and as a one-year volunteer. He would fight as a part of this unit on the Western Front of World War I, where he took part in the German invasion of Belgium and later fought in France. He received the Iron Cross 2nd Class and 1st Class, having been wounded six times, and finished the war with the rank of lieutenant, in charge of a company on the Eastern Front in southern Russia and Romania. At the cessation of hostilities, all German units in Dirlewanger's area were ordered to be interned in Romania, but Dirlewanger disobeyed these orders and led 600 men from his and other units back to Germany. According to German biographer Knut Stang, the war was a contributing factor that determined Dirlewanger's later life and his "terror warfare" methods, as "his amoral personality, with his alcoholism and his sadistic sexual orientation, was additionally shattered by the front experiences of the First World War and its frenzied violence and barbarism."

Interwar period
After the end of World War I, Dirlewanger, described in a police report as "a mentally unstable, violent fanatic and alcoholic, who had the habit of erupting into violence under the influence of drugs", joined various Freikorps right-wing paramilitary militias and fought against German communists in the Ruhr and Saxony, and against Poles in Upper Silesia. He participated in the suppression of the German Revolution of 1918–19 with the Freikorps in multiple German cities in 1920 and 1921. Later, he commanded an armed formation of students which was set up by him under the Württemberg "Highway Watch".

On Easter Sunday 1921, Dirlewanger commanded an armoured train that moved towards Sangerhausen, which had been occupied by the Communist Party of Germany militia group of Max Hoelz in one of their raids intended to inspire worker uprisings. An attack by Dirlewanger failed, and the enemy militiamen succeeded in cutting off his force. After the latter was reinforced by pro-government troops during the night, the Communists withdrew from the town. During this operation, Dirlewanger was grazed on the head by a gunshot. After the Nazi Party gained power, Dirlewanger was celebrated as the town's "liberator from the Red terrorists" and received its honorary citizenship in 1935.

Between his militant forays, he studied at the Goethe University Frankfurt and in 1922 obtained a doctorate in political science. He wrote his doctoral thesis as an analysis and critique of the planned economy, titled: “Critique of the idea of a planned management of the economy." The following year, he joined the Nazi Party and its SA militia, and later also the SS. From 1928 to 1931 he was an executive director of a textile factory owned by a Jewish family in Erfurt where he renounced active service in the SA but financially donated to the SA, possibly obtaining the money by embezzling from his company. Dirlewanger held various jobs, which included working at a bank and a knitwear factory. In 1933 after the Nazi seizure of power, Dirlewanger was rewarded to become director of the Heilbronn employment agency, a strategic post for local-level Nazi leaders.

Dirlewanger was repeatedly convicted for illegal arms possession and embezzlement. In 1934, he was convicted and sentenced to two years' imprisonment for "contributing to the delinquency of a minor with whom he was sexually involved", as well as the illegal use of a government vehicle and damaging said vehicle while under the influence of alcohol. Dirlewanger also lost his job, his doctor title and all military honours, and was expelled from the party. Soon after his release from the prison in Ludwigsburg, he was arrested again on similar charges for criminal recidivism. He was sent to the Welzheim concentration camp, either as what Stein feels was standard practice for deviant sexual offenders in Germany at the time or for creating a disturbance demanding the reversal of his criminal charges appearing before the Reich Chancellery. Dirlewanger was released and reinstated in the general reserve of the SS following personal intervention of his wartime companion and local NSDAP cadre comrade Gottlob Berger, who was also a long-time personal friend of the SS chief Heinrich Himmler and had become the head of the SS Head Office (SS-Hauptamt, SS-HA).

Dirlewanger next went to Spain, where he enlisted into the Spanish Legion during the Spanish Civil War. Through Berger he transferred to the German Condor Legion where he served from 1936 to 1939 and was wounded three times. Following further intervention on his behalf by his patron Berger, he successfully petitioned to have his case reconsidered in light of his service in Spain. Dirlewanger was reinstated into the NSDAP, albeit with a higher party number (No. 1,098,716). His doctorate was also restored by the University of Frankfurt.

World War II

At the beginning of World War II, Dirlewanger volunteered for the Waffen-SS and received the rank of Obersturmführer. He eventually became the commander of the so-called Dirlewanger Brigade (at first designated as a battalion, later expanded to a regiment and a brigade, and eventually a division), composed originally of a small group of former poachers along with soldiers of a more conventional background. It was believed that the excellent tracking and shooting skills of the poachers could be put to constructive use in the fight against partisans. Later, Dirlewanger's soldiers were mostly recruited from among the ever-increasing groups of German convicted criminals (civilian and military) and concentration camp inmates, eventually including mental asylum patients, homosexuals, interned Romani people, and (at the end of the war) even political prisoners sentenced for their anti-Nazi beliefs and activities.

The unit was assigned to security duties first in the General Government (occupied Poland), where Dirlewanger served as an SS-TV commandant of a labour camp at Stary Dzików. The camp was the subject of an abuse investigation by SS judge Georg Konrad Morgen, who accused Dirlewanger of wanton acts of murder, corruption, and Rassenschande or race defilement (Morgen consequently himself was reduced in rank and sent to the Eastern Front). According to Morgen, "Dirlewanger was a nuisance and a terror to the entire population. He repeatedly pillaged the ghetto in Lublin, extorting ransoms." Atrocities committed by Dirlewanger included injecting strychnine into young Jewish female prisoners, previously undressed and whipped, to watch them convulse to death in front of him and his friends for entertainment. According to Raul Hilberg, this camp was where "one of the first instances that reference was made to the 'soap-making rumor". According to the rumor, Dirlewanger "cut up Jewish women and boiled them with horse meat to make soap."

According to Peter Longerich, Dirlewanger's leadership "was characterized by continued alcohol abuse, looting, sadistic atrocities, rape, and murder—and his mentor Berger tolerated this behaviour, as did Himmler, who so urgently needed men such as the Sonderkommando Dirlewanger in his fight against 'subhumanity'." In his letter to Himmler, SS-Brigadeführer Odilo Globocnik recommended Dirlewanger, who "in charge of the Jewish camp of Dzikow ... was an excellent leader." During the Nuremberg trials after the war, Berger said: "Now Dr. Dirlewanger was hardly a good boy. You can't say that. But he was a good soldier, and he had one big mistake that he didn't know when to stop drinking."

In February 1942, the unit was assigned to "anti-gang" operations (Bandenbekämpfung) in Belarus. In Bloodlands: Europe Between Hitler and Stalin, Timothy Snyder wrote that "Dirlewanger's preferred method was to herd the local population inside a barn, set the barn on fire, and then shoot with machine guns anyone who tried to escape." Rounded-up civilians would be also routinely used as human shields and marched over minefields. In Masters of Death, Richard Rhodes wrote that Dirlewanger and his force "raped and tortured young women and slaughtered Jews Einsatzgruppen-style in Byelorussia beginning in 1942." Snyder cautiously estimated that the Sonderkommando, by then regiment-sized, killed at least 30,000 Belarusian civilians. Himmler was well aware of Dirlewanger's reputation and record, but nonetheless gave him the German Cross in Gold on 5 December 1943, for his unit's actions such as during Operation Cottbus (May–June 1943), during which Dirlewanger reportedly killed more than 14,000 alleged partisans.

In the summer of 1944, during Operation Bagration, Dirlewanger's unit suffered heavy losses while fighting against the Red Army. It was then hastily rebuilt and reformed into a Sturmbrigade (assault brigade) and used in the suppression of the Warsaw Uprising. Historian Martin Windrow wrote that in the summer of 1944 Dirlewanger led his "butchers, rapists and looters into action against the Warsaw Uprising, and quickly committed ... unspeakable crimes." In Warsaw, Dirlewanger participated in the Wola massacre, together with police units rounding up and shooting some 40,000 civilians, most of them in just two days. In the same Wola district, Dirlewanger burned three hospitals with patients inside, while the nurses were "whipped, gang-raped and finally hanged naked, together with the doctors" to the accompaniment of the popular song "In München steht ein Hofbräuhaus". Later, "they drank, raped and murdered their way through the Old Town, slaughtering civilians and fighters alike without distinction of age or sex." In the Old Town – where about 30,000 civilians were killed – several thousand wounded in field hospitals overrun by the Germans were shot and set on fire with flamethrowers. SS-Obergruppenführer Erich von dem Bach-Zelewski, overall commander of the forces pacifying Warsaw – and Dirlewanger's former superior officer in Belarus – described Dirlewanger as having "a typical mercenary nature."

In recognition of his work to crush the uprising and intimidate the population of the city, Dirlewanger received his final promotion, to the rank of SS-Oberführer, on 15 August 1944. In October, he was awarded the Knight's Cross of the Iron Cross, recommended for it by his superior officer in Warsaw, SS-Gruppenführer Heinz Reinefarth (after the war, Reinefarth lied about his role in Warsaw, even denying Dirlewanger had been under his command).

Dirlewanger then led his men in joining the efforts to put down the Slovak National Uprising in October 1944, eventually being posted on the front lines of Hungary and eastern Germany to fight against the advancing Red Army. In February 1945, the unit was expanded again and re-designated as the 36th Waffen Grenadier Division of the SS. That same month, Dirlewanger was shot in the chest while fighting against Soviet forces near Guben in Brandenburg and sent to the rear. It was his twelfth and final injury in the war. On 22 April, he went into hiding.

Dirlewanger is invariably described as an extremely cruel person by historians and researchers, including as "a psychopathic killer and child molester" by Steven Zaloga, "violently sadistic" by Richard Rhodes, and "an expert in extermination and a devotee of sadism and necrophilia" by J. Bowyer Bell.

Death
Dirlewanger was arrested on 1 June 1945 near the town of Altshausen in Upper Swabia by French occupation zone authorities while he was wearing civilian clothes, using a false name and hiding in a remote hunting lodge. He was recognised by a Jewish former concentration camp inmate and brought to a detention centre. He reportedly died around 5–7 June 1945 in a prison camp at Altshausen, probably as a result of ill treatment. There are numerous conflicting reports of the nature of his death: the French said that he died of a heart attack and was buried in an unmarked grave; or he was taken by armed Poles, presumably former forced laborers; or French military prisoners (of Polish descent); or Polish soldiers (29xième Groupement d'Infanterie Polonaise), who were mistreated in French custody; or former inmates and prison guards; or that he escaped and there were some rumours that he joined the French Foreign Legion. Ultimately his fate is unknown, but it is generally considered most likely that he died at Altshausen.

Awards
 Iron Cross (1914) 2nd Class (28 August 1914) and 1st Class (13 July 1916)
 Wound Badge (1914) in Gold (30 April 1918)
 Spanish Cross of Military Merit (1939)
 Clasp to the Iron Cross (1939) 2nd Class (24 May 1942) and 1st Class (16 September 1942)
 Wound Badge (1939) in Gold (9 July 1943)
 German Cross in Gold (5 December 1943)
 Close Combat Clasp (19 March 1944)
 Knight's Cross of the Iron Cross (30 September 1944)
 Bandit-warfare Badge in Silver (1944)

Legacy
Wolfsbrigade 44, a German Neo-Nazi group which was banned by the German government in December 2020, who according to The Times, used the "44" as code for "DD", short for "Division Dirlewanger".

References

Footnotes

Bibliography

, pp. 226–256

External links

Oskar Dirlewanger www.HolocaustResearchProject.org

1895 births
1945 deaths
20th-century Freikorps personnel
Child sexual abuse in Poland
Child sexual abuse in the Soviet Union
Condor Legion personnel
Criminals from Bavaria
German Army personnel of World War I
German military personnel of the Spanish Civil War
German people convicted of child sexual abuse
German people who died in prison custody
German rapists
Goethe University Frankfurt alumni
Holocaust perpetrators in Belarus
Holocaust perpetrators in Poland
Military personnel from Würzburg
Murdered criminals
People convicted of embezzlement
People convicted of statutory rape offenses
People from the Kingdom of Bavaria
People with antisocial personality disorder
Prisoners who died in French detention
Recipients of the clasp to the Iron Cross, 1st class
Recipients of the Gold German Cross
Recipients of the Knight's Cross of the Iron Cross
SS-Oberführer
Waffen-SS personnel
Warsaw Uprising German forces